

The Clay Research Award is an annual award given by the Oxford-based Clay Mathematics Institute to mathematicians to recognize their achievement in mathematical research.  The following mathematicians have received the award:

See also

 List of mathematics awards

External links 
Official web page
2014 Clay Research Awards
2017 Clay Research Awards
2019 Clay Research Awards
2021 Clay Research Award
2022 Clay Research Award

Mathematics awards
Awards established in 1999
Research awards
1999 establishments in England